The 1st Utah State Legislature was elected on Tuesday, November 5, 1895, and convened on Monday, January 13, 1896.

Dates of sessions

 1896 Biennial Session: January 13, 1896

Utah Senate

Make-up

Members

Utah House of Representatives

Make-up

Members

See also
 List of Utah state legislatures

References

Legislature
1
1895 in Utah Territory
1896 in Utah